

Events

January events
 January – GM introduces the EMD SD40.
 January – GE introduces the GE U28B.
 January 3 – British Rail begins full electric passenger services over the West Coast Main Line from Euston to Manchester and Liverpool with 100 mph (160 km/h) operation from London to Rugby. Services officially inaugurated April 18.

March events
 March 7 – The Western Region of British Railways closes the former Somerset & Dorset Joint Railway.
 March 25 – Hachinohe Rinkai Railway Line was opened.

April events
 April 20 – The second segment, between Predeal and Câmpina, of Căile Ferate Române's (in Romania) electrification is completed.

May events
 May 28 - Historic Red Clay Valley Incorporated begins operating steam tourist trains on the 10.2-mile Landenberg Branch of the Baltimore & Ohio Railroad. The tracks were constructed in 1871-2 by the Wilmington & Western Railroad. The operation is the 7th oldest standard gauge tourist heritage railroad operating in the US.

July events
 15 July – The London Midland Region of British Railways allows West Indian-born Asquith Xavier to transfer as a guard from London Marylebone to Euston, overturning the opposition of National Union of Railwaymen members of the local staff committee.
 July 17 – The first passenger operations begin at the Illinois Railway Museum using car number 415.

September events
 September 3 – The London Midland Region of British Railways closes the former Great Central Railway London Extension to passenger traffic between Aylesbury and Rugby Central, bringing an end to its career as "the last main line".

October events
 October 14 – Montreal Metro inaugurated.

December events
 December – GE introduces the GE U30B.

Unknown date events
 ALCO introduces the ALCO Century 415.
 The Chicago, Burlington & Quincy Railroad removes from service and donates the General Pershing Zephyr power car to the National Museum of Transport in St Louis, Missouri.
 Beyer, Peacock & Company of Manchester, England, turns out its last locomotives, British Rail Class 25/3 diesels.
 Norris Roy Crump returns to the presidency of Canadian Pacific for a short period, succeeding Robert Emerson. Crump, in turn, is succeeded by Ian David Sinclair.

Accidents

Births

Deaths

Unknown date deaths
 Martin W. Clement, president of the Pennsylvania Railroad 1935–1948 (b. 1881).

References
 White, John H., Jr. (Spring 1986), America's most noteworthy railroaders, Railroad History, Railway and Locomotive Historical Society, 154, p. 9–15.